Rabodanges is a former commune in the Orne department of the Normandy region of north-western France. On 1 January 2016, it was merged into the new commune of Putanges-le-Lac.

History
The former name of the parish was "Culley-sur-Orne" (until 1650).

The name "Rabodanges" is a corruption of "Rabodinghes" — a fief situated in Artois close to Saint-Omer — from where the manorial family which also owned the land of Culley-sur-Orne originated; the title of nobility was raised to "Marquis de Rabodanges" by King Louis XIV. The last representative of this family, established in Normandy since the 16th century, died without issue in 1792.

Demography

Places of interest
 Its chateau built in the classical style (open for visits)
 Rabodanges is also known for its lake, on which one can water-ski.

See also
 Communes of the Orne department
 Robert Bordet, a Norman adventurer, born in Rabodanges, who acquired the county of Tarragona (Spain) in 1129.

References

Former communes of Orne